Mish-Piyan is a rural locality (a village) in Verkh-Invenskoye Rural Settlement, Kudymkarsky District, Perm Krai, Russia. The population was 84 as of 2010. There are 3 streets.

Geography 
Mish-Piyan is located 40 km southwest of Kudymkar (the district's administrative centre) by road. Demino is the nearest rural locality.

References 

Rural localities in Kudymkarsky District